Tulipa cypria, the Cyprus tulip, is a tulip, an erect perennial bulbous herb, 15–40 cm high (in blossom),  with glabrous, glaucous leaves. The four leaves  are alternate, simple, entire, fleshy, the two lower ones larger, lanceolate, 10-20 x 2–6 cm, with conspicuously undulate margins, the two higher much smaller, nearly linear. One terminal showy flower, perianth cup shaped, of six free, petaloid segments, 2.5-9 x 1-3.5 cm, with dark blood-red colour, internally with a black blotch bordered by a yellow zone. It flowers March–April. The fruit is a capsule.

Habitat

Distribution
The plant is endemic to Cyprus, on Akamas, Kormakitis and some areas of the Pentadaktylos range. It is very rare and strictly protected.

References

External links

cypria
Endemic flora of Cyprus
Ephemeral plants
Plants described in 1934